James Clews Cowan (16 June 1926 – 20 June 1968) was a Scottish football goalkeeper who played for St Mirren, Morton, Sunderland, Third Lanark and the Scotland national team.

Career
Cowan was born in Paisley and began his professional career with St Mirren before moving to Morton in 1944. He remained at Cappielow for nine years, playing in the 1948 Scottish Cup Final defeat to Rangers. During his time at Morton he won all of his 25 Scotland caps, making his debut against Belgium in April 1948. He played in the 1949 and 1951 wins against England at Wembley, results which ultimately won Scotland the 1948–49 and 1950-51 British Home Championships.

During his time at Morton, the club were twice relegated from the First Division (1948–49 and 1951–52). After the club failed to win promotion in 1952–53, Cowan was transferred to English club Sunderland in June 1953. He returned to Scotland two years later with Third Lanark and played for a season at Cathkin Park before retiring.

On 11 November 2007, Cowan was posthumously inducted into the Scottish Football Hall of Fame.

Personal life
His son Ronnie Cowan is a Scottish National Party (SNP) politician, who was elected at the 2015 UK general election as the Member of Parliament (MP) for Inverclyde.

Career statistics

International appearances

References

External links

1926 births
1968 deaths
Scottish footballers
Scotland international footballers
Association football goalkeepers
St Mirren F.C. players
Greenock Morton F.C. players
Sunderland A.F.C. players
Third Lanark A.C. players
Footballers from Paisley, Renfrewshire
Scottish Football Hall of Fame inductees
Scottish Football League players
English Football League players
Scottish Football League representative players